John Custis  (1629 – January 29, 1696) was a North American Colonial British merchant, planter and politician and one of the founders of the Custis family of Virginia.

Early and family life
This John Custis emigrated to the Virginia Colony with his sister Ann and his first wife, probably from Rotterdam in the Netherlands, where their Royalist-learning father (also John Custis) had fled with his family to escape the English Civil War, and came to run a tavern catering to fellow emigrants, as well as traded. His sister Ann had married Argoll Yeardley, the son of George Yeardley, who became governor of the Virginia colony before dying in the colony in 1627. The Custis siblings probably sailed with Henry Norwood who left in a sloop from Argoll Yeardley's house for Jamestown, and arrived in 1649 or 1650. Years later John and his younger brother William were naturalized British citizens on the same day in November 1658. 

Custis married three times. His first wife, Elizabeth Robinson, bore one son, John Custis III before her death. Custis married Alicia Burdett in 1656, and lived at her father's house, which he had purchased from Thomas Burdett while patenting land next to it. He built a house that he named Arlington Plantation, where he would ultimately be buried. However, Alicia died by 1680, when John Custis married the widow Tabitha Scarburgh Brown, who had inherited land from her father and had a daughter who bore a daughter who married Custis' nephew. However, the marriage grew rocky over Custis' management of Tabitha's property.

Planter and politician

After emigrating to the colony, Custis became a merchant and landowner and held various political offices in the county and eventually a member of the House of Burgesses and then the Governor's Council. Custis settled on what was initially the only shire on Virginia's Eastern Shore, then called Accomac County after a native American settlement, was split into two, and John Custis owned land in what became the new Northumberland County. In July 1676, during Bacon's Rebellion, Governor Berkeley took refuge at Arlington plantation, the house this John Custis had erected on his Arlington plantation in what had become Northumberland County.

The elder brother of merchant William Custis who also served the same 1677 term in the House of Burgesses, when Northampton County (which this John Custis represented) was split off from Accomack County (which his brother represented).

References

1629 births
1696 deaths
American planters
British North American Anglicans
Custis family of Virginia
People from Northampton County, Virginia
Virginia Governor's Council members
House of Burgesses members
American slave owners